Greenwood is an unincorporated community in southeastern Morgan County in the U.S. state of West Virginia's Eastern Panhandle.

References

Unincorporated communities in Morgan County, West Virginia
Unincorporated communities in West Virginia